The Victoria's Secret Fashion Show is an annual fashion show sponsored by Victoria's Secret, a brand of lingerie and sleepwear. Victoria's Secret uses the show to promote and market its goods in high-profile settings. The show features some of the world's leading fashion models, such as current Victoria's Secret Angels Adriana Lima, Alessandra Ambrosio, Candice Swanepoel, Lily Aldridge, Lais Ribeiro, Elsa Hosk, Jasmine Tookes, Sara Sampaio, Martha Hunt, Taylor Hill, Stella Maxwell, Romee Strijd, and Josephine Skriver. Behati Prinsloo missed this year's show, once again, due to the birth of her second child. The show also featured PINK spokesmodels Grace Elizabeth and Zuri Tibby.

This was the last Victoria's Secret Fashion Show to be aired on CBS.

The Victoria's Secret Fashion Show 2017 was recorded in Shanghai, China at the Mercedes-Benz Arena, it was the first Victoria's Secret Fashion Show held in Asia. The show featured musical performances by Harry Styles, Miguel, Leslie Odom Jr., and Jane Zhang. Early rumors suggested that Taylor Swift would perform alongside Styles, but this was determined to be a hoax. A performance by Katy Perry was cancelled due to her visa being revoked, which also affected several models and media members from attending the show. Angel Lais Ribeiro was wearing the Victoria's Secret Fantasy Bra: The Champagne Nights Fantasy Bra worth $2,000,000.

Ambrosio announced her departure with the brand as an Angel right before the show, which is why the order of the first and last segments were swapped last minute to let her close the entire show. However, the TV version featured the fifth segment, Goddesses, as the last segment which made it look like as if Vanessa Moody seemingly closed the show.

Fashion show segments

Segment 1: Punk Angels

Segment 2: Porcelain Angel

Segment 3: A Winter's Tale

Segment 4: Millennial Nation (PINK)

Segment 5: Goddesses

Segment 6: Nomadic Adventures

Finale 

 Alessandra Ambrosio and  Adriana Lima led the finale.

Index

References

External links
Official Site

Victoria's Secret
2017 in fashion